The Hong Kong Legal Information Institute (HKLII; pronounced "H K Lee") is a non-governmental organisation in Hong Kong. Its mission is to provide free access to primary legal materials (and some publicly available secondary material) from Hong Kong.

Operation of HKLII
HKLII was developed and is jointly operated by the University of Hong Kong's Department of Computer Science and Faculty of Law, with the assistance of the Australasian Legal Information Institute.

Notes

References

External links

Law of Hong Kong
Free Access to Law Movement